The European Championships records in swimming are the fastest times ever swum in European Swimming Championships' events.

Long course (50 m)
Championship records at the European Aquatics Championships since 1926.

Men

Women

Mixed relay

Short course (25 m)
Championship records at the European Short Course (SC) Championships since 1991.

Men

Women

Mixed relay

References
General
European Championships records 13 August 2022 updated
Specific

External links
SwimRankings.net, LEN's Official results database.

European championships
Records
Swimming